507th may refer to:

507th Air Refueling Wing, a wing of the United States Air Force based out of Tinker Air Force Base, Oklahoma
507th Bombardment Squadron, an inactive United States Air Force unit
507th Infantry Regiment (United States) (507th PIR), a regiment of the 82nd Airborne Division and, later, 17th Airborne Division of the US Army
507th Maintenance Company, a unit of the US Army which provided maintenance support to 5th Battalion, 52nd Air Defense Artillery at Fort Bliss, Texas

See also
507 (number)
507, the year 507 (DVII) of the Julian calendar
507 BC